This is a summary of the electoral history of Lal Krishna Advani, who was Deputy Prime Minister of India from 2002 to 2004.

Advani entered into the Parliament of India in 1970 as a Member of Rajya Sabha. He served as a Member of Rajya Sabha for four terms until 1989.

Advani contested his first Lok Sabha election in 1989 from New Delhi. He was elected as a Member of the Lok Sabha by defeating V. Mohini Giri of the Indian National Congress. Later in 1991, he contested from two constituencies : Gandhinagar and New Delhi. He was elected as Member of the Lok Sabha from both the constituencies, defeating G. I. Patel in Gandhinagar and Rajesh Khanna in New Delhi. To comply with the law that an elected representative cannot represent more than one constituency, he vacated the New Delhi seat. In 1996, he did not contest Lok Sabha elections from any constituency over allegations of involvement in the Hawala scandal.

In 1998, Advani was again elected to the Lok Sabha from the Gandhinagar constituency. Later he was re-elected from the Gandhinagar in 1999, 2004, 2009 and 2014 and represented Gandhinagar in Parliament till 2019 when he was succeeded by Amit Shah.

Advani served a total four terms in Parliament as a Member of Rajya Sabha and seven terms as a Member of the Lok Sabha.

Parliamentary terms

Election results

1989 results

1991 results

General election 1998

General election 1999

General election 2004

General election 2009

General election 2014

See also 
Electoral history of Atal Bihari Vajpayee 
Electoral history of Narendra Modi

Notes

References

Electoral history of Indian politicians